Adam Majchrowicz (born 5 October 1991) is a Polish tennis player.

Majchrowicz has a career high ATP singles ranking of 1206 achieved on 2 February 2015. He also has a career high ATP doubles ranking of 248 achieved on 5 October 2015. Majchrowicz has won 10 ITF doubles titles.

Majchrowicz won his first ATP Challenger title at the 2015 Internationaux de Tennis de Vendée, partnering Sander Arends.

Tour titles

Doubles

External links

1991 births
Living people
Polish male tennis players
Sportspeople from Bydgoszcz